Vaba may refer to –

Newspapers
Vaba Maa, an Estonian newspaper of the 1920s
Vaba Eesti Sõna, an American Estonian expat newspaper established in 1949

Ships
, and American cargo ship/tanker in service 1920–29